is a Japanese manga series written and illustrated by Nanae Chrono. The manga has been serialized in Comic Blade by Mag Garden from December 2005 to July 2009 issue, and then in Web Comic Beat's online magazine from July 25, 2011 to February 25, 2015, with individual chapters collected into ten tankōbon volumes. The manga is based on the Japanese folklore Momotaro which originated from an ancient Chinese Mythology.

Plot
After gate-crashing onto the mythical Tougen Island also known as Shangri-La, Mutsu Kokonose, the ninth generation head of the Mutsu Clan, claims to bring down the wrath of God onto the demons and regain the island from Momotarou control.

Characters

Main characters

The nine-year-old protagonist of the story. Kokonose is the ninth generation lord of the infamous Mutsu Clan which was descended from Demons. He has an arrogant personality and the guts to try to turn one of the academy teachers into his servant on his first day. Kononse was revealed to be an exceptional Exorcist, exorcising evil spirits since the age of one. During the Selection test, he was the only student who managed to acquire the legendary Peach card which was rumored to be the card that only the first generation Momotarou had ever gotten it.

A twenty-year-old "servant" of Kokonse. Kashii wears glasses and has a sort of Mohawk styled hair. He has an extreme negative personality and looks at everything in despair. He is revealed to possess the "Monkey" characteristic of the four types since he couldn't break through the iron bar during the exam.

Manga

Volumes list

References

External links
 Official website of Mag Garden 
 Official website of Comic Blade at Mag Garden 

Shōnen manga
2005 manga
Action anime and manga
Fantasy anime and manga
Mag Garden manga
Nanae Chrono